Tony Dobbin (born 1 May 1972) is a retired Northern Irish National Hunt jockey who rode mainly in Great Britain. He rode the winner of the Grand National on Lord Gyllene in 1997 for owner Sir Stanley Clarke CBE, and won over 1,200 races during his career in the saddle. He was the regular stable jockey for Nicky Richards. He retired from racing on Thursday, 10 April 2008 riding the winner of his final race, Ballyvoge, at Carlisle Racecourse. He has assisted his wife, Rose Davidson, training racehorses since 2009.

Major wins
 Great Britain
 Grand National - (1) Lord Gyllene (1997)
 Ascot Chase - (2) One Man (1998), Monet's Garden (2007)
 Melling Chase - (1) Monet's Garden (2007)
 Liverpool Hurdle - (1) Monet's Garden (2005)
 Fighting Fifth Hurdle - (2) Barton (2000), Arcalis (2005)
 Aintree Hurdle - (1) Barton (2001)
 Mildmay Novices' Chase - (1) Barton (2002)
 Anniversary 4-Y-O Novices' Hurdle - (1) Quazar (2002)

 Ireland
 Punchestown Champion Hurdle - (1) Quazar (2003)

References
 BBC website profile

1972 births
Lester Award winners
Living people
People from Downpatrick
Sportsmen from Northern Ireland
Jockeys from Northern Ireland